This is a list of notable restaurants in Barcelona.

Restaurants in Barcelona
 Àbac (three Michelin stars)
 Alkimia (one Michelin star)
 Caelis (one Michelin star)
 Can Fabes (two Michelin stars)
 Capritx (one Michelin star)
 Cinc Sentits (one Michelin star)
 Comerç 24 (one Michelin star)
 Dos Cielos (one Michelin star)
 Enoteca (two Michelin star)
 Evo (one Michelin star)
 Gaig (one Michelin star)
 Hisop (one Michelin star)
 Hofmann (one Michelin star)
 Lasarte (three Michelin stars)
 Manairó (one Michelin star)
 Moments (two Michelin star)
 Moo (one Michelin star)
 Neichel (one Michelin star)
 Saüc (one Michelin star)
 Via Veneto (one Michelin star)

See also
 Lists of restaurants

References

Lists of companies of Spain
Barcelona

Restaurants